Giuliano Nostini (3 October 1912 – 16 August 1983) was an Italian fencer. He won a silver medal in the team foil event at the 1948 Summer Olympics.

References

External links
 

1912 births
1983 deaths
Italian male foil fencers
Olympic fencers of Italy
Fencers at the 1948 Summer Olympics
Olympic silver medalists for Italy
Olympic medalists in fencing
Medalists at the 1948 Summer Olympics